Elmton with Creswell is a civil parish in the Bolsover District of Derbyshire, England. The parish contains ten listed buildings that are recorded in the National Heritage List for England. Of these, one is listed at Grade II*, the middle of the three grades, and the others are at Grade II, the lowest grade.  The parish contains the villages of Elmton and Creswell, and the surrounding countryside.  The listed buildings consist of three farmhouses, a farm building, two churches, three schools, and a war memorial.


Key

Buildings

References

Citations

Sources

 

Lists of listed buildings in Derbyshire